Ana y Bruno (English: Ana and Bruno) is a 2017 Mexican computer-animated horror-comedy-drama film based on the novel, Ana by Daniel Emil. It is produced by Altavista Films and Lo Coloco Films, and co-produced by Ítaca Films and Ánima Estudios.

After 13 years of production, the film was released in Mexico on 31 August 2018, receiving favorable reviews. It is described to be the most expensive animated film in the Mexican film industry with the budget of $104 million pesos (est. $5.35 million USD).

The film has won three "Best Animated Feature" awards including one from the 61st Ariel Awards in which the film has also earned nominations for "Adapted Screenplay" and "Original Score".

Plot 
A young girl named Ana searches for her father to help save her troubled mother.

Voice cast 
 Galia Mayer as Ana
 Marina de Tavira as Carmen
 Damián Alcázar as Ricardo
 Armando Ürtusuaztegui as Bruno
 Julieta Egurrola as Martita
 Regina Orozco as Rosi
 Héctor Bonilla as Dr. Mendez
 Daniel Carrera Pasternac as Daniel

Release 
The film had its premiere at the Annecy International Animated Film Festival on 17 June 2017, and later Morelia International Film Festival on 28 October 2017.

The film was released in theaters in Mexico on 31 August 2018, distributed by Corazon Films. It later premiered exclusively on the Pantaya digital platform in the United States with english dub.

Box-office 
Ana y Bruno debuted at #6, grossing $16.8 million pesos in its first week, bombing at the national box-office. It grossed a total of $21.3 million pesos (est. $1.1 million USD)

Reception 
Prior to its release, the film has received praise from other acclaimed Mexican film directors, including Alfonso Cuarón and Guillermo del Toro.
The film received favorable reviews from critics upon release, with many praising the story and theme, while criticism is focused on the animation and content. On Rotten Tomatoes, the film has a 71% rating based on reviews from 7 critics.

The film was criticized by some parents, calling it "unsuitable" for younger viewers, and even caused some to leave theaters early during the film's showings. Mexico's RTC film rating system, gave the film an "A" rating, allowing attendance of viewers of all ages (equivalent to the "G" MPAA rating) which received some backlash. The nature of the film's plot is focused on real-life situations such as mental illness and death, and has a "dark tone" which parents call "depressing". They also criticized the designs of certain characters in the film for being "terrifying". Other family viewers have praised the film's story and writing, while otherwise criticizing the overall content. It is believed that the film's controversy has led to its underperformance.

Accolades

References

External links 
 IMCINE profile (in Spanish)
 

Mexican animated films
2017 computer-animated films
2010s Spanish-language films
2017 animated films
2017 films
Mexican fantasy comedy-drama films
2010s fantasy comedy-drama films
2010s monster movies
Films about dysfunctional families
Films based on Mexican novels
Films about depression
Films directed by Carlos Carrera
Ánima Estudios films
2017 comedy films
2017 drama films
Film controversies
Rating controversies in film
2010s Mexican films